The Aviastroitel AC-5M is a Russian mid-wing, single-seat, T-tailed motor glider and unmanned aerial vehicle that is produced by Aviastroitel, now Glider Air Craft.

Design and development
The AC-5M is derived from the motorized version of the Aviastroitel AC-4 Russia. Its design goals were to produce a simple and inexpensive self-launching sailplane. It had its first flight in December 1999 and production commenced in 2000 with a total of 35 completed.

The AC-5M features a  span wing that employs a Wortmann FX60-157 airfoil. The wings are mounted on the fuselage with a single cam-pin and the ailerons and air brakes hook-up automatically. Assembly can be accomplished by one person in five minutes. The engine is a  Zanzottera MZ-35R, which is a special narrow engine design developed specifically for retractable engine motor gliders. The engine retracts rearwards into a bay behind the cockpit and is closed by two doors for drag reduction. The propeller is a two bladed wooden design of  diameter. The landing gear is a retractable  monowheel gear with a lever-actuated drum brake, but without suspension. The canopy provides 300° field of view and is jettisonable.

In 2003 the aircraft sold for US$33,000.

Operational history
In October 2011 there were 22 AC-5Ms registered with the US Federal Aviation Administration and one registered with Transport Canada. Because the aircraft was never type certified all American examples are in the Experimental - Racing/Exhibition category, while Canadian are in the Limited Category.

Variants

AC-5M
Single seat motor glider powered by a  Zanzottera MZ-35R two-stroke powerplant.
AC-5MP
Unmanned aerial vehicle version powered by a  Rotax 912UL four stroke powerplant mounted on a fixed, non-retractable pylon.
AC-5K
Version of the 5M, but with a fixed  Simonini Victor 1 engine and a retractable two-blade wooden propeller.
AC-5Me
American developed prototype electric propulsion variant powered by a 25 kW (33.5 hp) Rotex RET-60, MGM-Compro HBC-280120-3EI controller and proprietary 4.4 kWh battery pack incorporating 448 Molicel P-26A cells.

Specifications (AC-5M)

See also

References

External links
Photos of the AC-5M
Photo of the AC-5M

1990s Russian sailplanes